The 2008–09 season is FC Vaslui's 7th season of its existence, and its 4th in a row, in Liga I. Because it finished 7th, FC Vaslui played on UEFA Intertoto Cup in the third round. FC Vaslui passed by Neftchi Baku, and it qualified for the 3rd preliminary round of UEFA Cup. In the play-off, it was eliminated by Slavia Prague, because of the away goal rule, being the only Romanian team, who was eliminated, without losing in UEFA Cup that season. In the championship, they started perfectly, after a 1–0 win against FC Steaua București and a 3–1 win against arch rivals Poli Iaşi. But because of the injuries, the team results began to be poor. After a 1–1 draw with Gaz Metan Mediaş, Viorel Hizo was dismissed, and Viorel Moldovan was named the new coach. The team entered in the winter break, on the 9th place. In the winter break, Adrian Porumboiu spent over 3 million €, for new signings, being the only Romanian team, who were not affected by the Global Economical Crisis. With Moldovan, the team reached the semi-finals of Romanian Cup, but after a 1–4 loss against Gloria Buzău, Moldovan was also sacked, and as a manager, was named the assistant Dulca. With Dulca as a coach, FC Vaslui resurrected, and saved its season, in the last 2 games, after a 1–0 win against FC Rapid București, and also a 1–0 win against Universitatea Craiova in front of 25.000 fans on Ion Oblemencu. The team finished 5th, and qualified in the 3rd round of UEFA Europa League.

First-team squad

 T=Total
 L=Liga I
 C=Cupa României
 I=UEFA Europa League, Intertoto UEFA Cup

Transfers

In

Summer

Winter

Out

Summer

Winter

Loaned out

Overall

Spending
Summer:   €2,230,000 

Winter:   €3,700,000 

Total:   €5,930,000

Income
Summer:   €1,200,000 

Winter:   €0,450,000 

Total:   €1,650,000

Outcome
Summer:  €1,030,000 

Winter:  €3,250,000 

Total:  €4,280,000

Statistics

Appearances and goals
Last updated on 10 June 2009.

|-
|colspan="12"|Players sold or loaned out during the season
|-

|}

Top scorers

Top assists

Disciplinary record

Overall

{|class="wikitable"
|-
|Games played || 44 (34 Liga I, 4 UEFA Cup, 2 UEFA Intertoto Cup, 4 Cupa României)
|-
|Games won || 23 (17 Liga I, 2 UEFA Cup, 1 UEFA Intertoto Cup, 3 Cupa României)
|-
|Games drawn ||  8 (6 Liga I, 2 UEFA Cup)
|-
|Games lost || 13 (11 Liga I, 1 UEFA Intertoto Cup, 1 Cupa României)
|-
|Goals scored || 60
|-
|Goals conceded || 44
|-
|Goal difference || +16
|-
|Yellow cards || 98
|-
|Red cards || 4
|-
|Worst discipline ||  Bogdan Buhuş with 14 yellow cards
|-
|Best result || 3–0 (H) v Poli Iaşi – Cupa României – 5 October 20083–0 (H) v Gloria Buzău – Liga I – 16 November 20083–0 (H) v Gloria Bistriţa – Liga I – 14 March 2009
|-
|Worst result || 0–3 (A) v CFR Cluj – Liga I – 4 March 20091–4 (A) v Dinamo – Liga I – 11 March 20091–4 (A) v Gloria Buzău – Liga I – 23 May 2009
|-
|Most appearances ||  Dušan Kuciak with 44 appearances
|-
|Top scorers ||  Mike Temwanjera (11 goals) Lucian Burdujan (11 goals)
|-
|Points || 57/102 (55.8%)
|-

Performances
Updated to games played on 10 June 2009.

Goal minutes
Updated to games played on 10 June 2009.

Liga I

League table

Results summary

Results by round

Matches

Liga I

Cupa României

UEFA Cup

2nd Qualifying Round

First round

UEFA Intertoto Cup

References

FC Vaslui seasons
Vaslui